Malhara Assembly constituency (formerly, Malehra) is one of the 230 Vidhan Sabha (Legislative Assembly) constituencies of Madhya Pradesh state in central India. This constituency came into existence in 1951, as one of the 48 Vidhan Sabha constituencies of the erstwhile Vindhya Pradesh state, but it was abolished in 1956. It again came into existence in 1961, following delimitation of the legislative assembly constituencies.

Overview
Malhara (constituency number 53) is one of the 6 Vidhan Sabha constituencies located in Chhatarpur district. This constituency covers the entire Bada Malhara tehsil, Bakswaha nagar panchayat and part of Bijawar tehsil of the district.

Malhara is part of Damoh Lok Sabha constituency along with seven other Vidhan Sabha segments, namely, Deori, Rehli and Banda in Sagar district and Pathariya, Damoh, Jabera and Hatta in Damoh district.

Members of Legislative Assembly
As from a constituency of Vindhya Pradesh:
 1951: Basant Lal, Indian National Congress
As from a constituency of Madhya Pradesh:
 1962: Hans Raj, Indian National Congress
 1967: Govind Singh Judeo, Independent
 1972: Dashrath, Indian National Congress
 1977: Jang Bahadur Singh, Janata Party
 1980: Kapur Chand Ghuwara, Communist Party of India
 1985: Shivraj Singh, Bharatiya Janata Party
 1990: Ashok Kumar, Bharatiya Janata Party
 1993: Uma Yadav, Indian National Congress
 1998: Swami Prasad Lodhi, Bharatiya Janata Party
 2003: Uma Bharti, Bharatiya Janata Party
 2006 (By Poll): Kapur Chand Ghuwara, Bharatiya Janata Party
 2008: Rekha Yadav, Bharatiya Janshakti Party
 2013: Rekha Yadav, Bharatiya Janata Party
 2018: Pradyuman Singh Lodhi, Indian National Congress
 2020 (By Poll): Pradyuman Singh Lodhi, Bharatiya Janata Party

See also
 Bakswaha
 Bada Malhara

References

Chhatarpur district
Assembly constituencies of Madhya Pradesh